Francis North, 1st Earl of Guilford (13 April 1704 – 4 August 1790), of Wroxton Abbey, Oxfordshire, styled as Lord Guilford between 1729 and 1752, was a British Whig politician who sat in the House of Commons from 1727 until 1729 at which point he succeeded to the peerage as Baron Guildford. He also became the Treasurer of Queen Charlotte of the Royal House of Mecklenburg. His son, Frederick North, was the famous Prime Minister of Great Britain who lost the American Revolution War under his term.

Early life
 North was the son of Francis North, 2nd Baron Guilford, and his wife Alice Brownlow, daughter of Sir John Brownlow, 3rd Baronet, of Humby, Lincolnshire. He was educated at Eton College and matriculated at Trinity College, Oxford on 25 March 1721, aged 16. He undertook a Grand Tour in about 1722.

Career
At the 1727 British general election, North was returned unopposed as Whig Member of Parliament for Banbury on the family interest. When he succeeded his father as third Baron Guilford on 17 October 1729, he vacated his seat in the House of Commons and entered the House of Lords. He became Gentleman of the Bedchamber to Frederick, Prince of Wales in October 1730. In 1734, he succeeded his cousin, William North, 6th Baron North as seventh Baron North. He was appointed governor to Prince George, later George III, in September 1750 which lasted until April 1751 and also gave up his other court position in 1751. On 8 April 1752, he was created Earl of Guilford in the Peerage of Great Britain. He was appointed High Steward of Banbury for life in 1766. In December 1773 he was appointed treasurer to Queen Consort for life.

Family
North married Lady Lucy Montagu of the House of Montagu, daughter of George Montagu, 1st Earl of Halifax, in 1728. She died in 1734, and he married as his second wife Elizabeth Kaye, daughter of Arthur Kaye, 3rd Baronet, in 1736. After her death in 1745, he married as his third wife Catherine Furnase, daughter of Robert Furnese, 2nd Baronet, in 1751. She died in 1776, aged 86.

Death and legacy
Lord Guilford survived his third wife by fourteen years and died in August 1790, aged 86. He was succeeded by his son from his first marriage, Frederick, who had previously served as Prime Minister of Great Britain from 1770 to 1782. His stepson Lord Dartmouth also served in government.

Lord Guilford is the namesake of Guilford County, North Carolina. and Guilford, Windham County, Vermont.

References

Sources
Kidd, Charles, Williamson, David (editors). Debrett's Peerage and Baronetage (1990 edition). New York: St Martin's Press, 1990.

1704 births
1790 deaths
18th-century English nobility
People educated at Eton College
Alumni of Trinity College, Oxford
British MPs 1727–1734
Earls of Guilford
Members of the Parliament of Great Britain for English constituencies
Francis
Parents of prime ministers of the United Kingdom
Barons Guilford
Barons North